The Vampire Diaries, an American supernatural drama, was renewed for a fourth season by the U.S. channel The CW on May 3, 2012, seven days before the third season's finale. Unlike the previous seasons that aired in September, it premiered on October 11, 2012, to avoid competition from major television shows. Season 4 consisted of 23 episodes instead of the usual 22 episodes. 

On January 11, 2013, it was announced that a back-door pilot focused on the Originals, titled The Originals will air on April 25 for series pick-up. On April 26, 2013, The CW announced that The Originals, The Vampire Diaries spin-off series, was picked up for a full season slated to premiere next fall.

On February 11, 2013, The CW renewed the series for a fifth season.

Cast

Main

Nina Dobrev as Elena Gilbert / Katherine Pierce, aka. Katerina Petrova / Tatia Petrova / Amara Petrova
Paul Wesley as Stefan Salvatore / Silas 
Ian Somerhalder as Damon Salvatore
Steven R. McQueen as Jeremy Gilbert
Kat Graham as Bonnie Bennett
Zach Roerig as Matt Donovan
Candice Accola as Caroline Forbes
Michael Trevino as Tyler Lockwood
Joseph Morgan as Klaus Mikaelson

Recurring

Claire Holt as Rebekah Mikaelson
David Alpay as Atticus Shane
Grace Phipps as April Young
Phoebe Tonkin as Hayley Marshall
Marguerite MacIntyre as Liz Forbes
Todd Williams as Connor Jordan
Rick Worthy as Rudy Hopkins
Nathaniel Buzolic as Kol Mikaelson
Charlie Bewley as Galen Vaughn
Susan Walters as Carol Lockwood
Arielle Kebbel as Lexi Branson
Daniel Gillies as Elijah Mikaelson

Special guest
Jasmine Guy as Sheila Bennett

Guest

Alyssa Diaz as Kim
Matt Davis as Alaric Saltzman
Torrey DeVitto as Meredith Fell
Paul Telfer as Alexander
Scott Parks as Silas
Michael Reilly Burke as Pastor Young
Camille Guaty as Caitlin Shane
Cynthia Addai-Robinson as Aja
Blake Hood as Dean
Ser'Darius Blain as Chris
Madeline Zima as Charlotte
Adina Porter as Nandi LaMarche
Persia White as Abby Bennett Wilson
Charles Michael Davis as Marcel Gerard
Daniella Pineda as Sophie Deveraux
Leah Pipes as Camille O'Connell
Callard Harris as Thierry Vanchure
Eka Darville as Diego
Malaya Rivera Drew as Jane-Anne Deveraux
Lex Shontz as Deputy Adams (“Growing Pains” episode).

Episodes

Production
On May 3, 2012 The CW renewed The Vampire Diaries for a fourth season. Unlike previous seasons, it started on October 11. Kevin Williamson, Julie Plec, Leslie Morgenstein and Bob Levy were executive producers for the series. The season was concluded on May 16, 2013.

Casting
On August 7, 2012 it was announced that Phoebe Tonkin and Todd Williams would join the show as recurring characters in the fourth season. Tonkin portrayed Hayley Marshall, a friend of Tyler's. Williams portrayed Connor, a vampire hunter.

The Olympic gymnast Gabby Douglas made an appearance in "My Brother's Keeper" as a volunteer decorator for the Miss Mystic Falls Beauty Pageant. On the CW website, an interview with Douglas shares her experience on set and with the cast.

Starting with episode 13, Charlie Bewley will join the show as Vaughn, like Connor a vampire hunter, and Camille Guaty as Professor Shane's dead wife Caitlin, who is going to reveal information about him.

In February 2013, it was announced that Daniella Pineda was cast as the witch Sophie for episode 20 "The Originals". This episode serves as a backdoor-pilot for a possible spin-off series, revolving around the Originals and taking place in the French Quarter of New Orleans.

Reception

Critical response
Based on 16 reviews, the fourth season holds a 69% on Rotten Tomatoes with an average rating of 7.81 out of 10. The site's critics' consensus reads, "Vampire Diaries gets the best out of star Nina Dobrev, but could use some fresh blood on the page as plotlines struggle to move the series forward."

Ratings

References

External links
 

4
2012 American television seasons
2013 American television seasons
 
Fiction about purgatory